Somethin' Slick!' is an album by organist Jack McDuff recorded in 1963 and released on the Prestige label.

Reception
Allmusic awarded the album 3 stars.

Track listing 
All compositions by Jack McDuff except as indicated
 "Our Miss Brooks" (Harold Vick) - 10:45
 "Somethin' Slick" - 6:34
 "Smut" - 6:14
 "How High the Moon" (Nancy Hamilton, Morgan Lewis) - 7:34
 "It's a Wonderful World" (Harold Adamson, Jan Savitt) - 5:23

Personnel 
Jack McDuff - organ
Harold Vick - tenor saxophone (tracks 1, 2, 4)
Eric Dixon - tenor saxophone (tracks 2, 4)
Kenny Burrell (as K.B. Groovington) - guitar
Joe Dukes - drums

References 

Jack McDuff albums
1963 albums
Prestige Records albums
Albums recorded at Van Gelder Studio
Albums produced by Ozzie Cadena